The Anderson County Courthouse, located at 4th and Oak Streets in Garnett, is the seat of government of Anderson County, Kansas. The courthouse was built from 1901 to 1902 by contractors Latimer & Benning at a cost of $75,000. Architect George P. Washburn designed the courthouse in the Romanesque Revival style. The courthouse features a central bell tower and four corner towers with conical roofs. The building's entrances are topped by fan-shaped windows and surrounded by stone arches. The third-floor windows are also arched, and the stone arches are linked by a band of stone encircling the building.

The courthouse was listed on the National Register of Historic Places in 1972.

References

Courthouses on the National Register of Historic Places in Kansas
Buildings and structures in Anderson County, Kansas
County courthouses in Kansas
Romanesque Revival architecture in Kansas
Government buildings completed in 1902
National Register of Historic Places in Anderson County, Kansas